Ethnic nationalism, also known as ethnonationalism, is a form of nationalism wherein the nation and nationality are defined in terms of ethnicity, with emphasis on an ethnocentric (and in some cases an  ethnocratic) approach to various political issues related to national affirmation of a particular ethnic group.

The central tenet of ethnic nationalists is that "nations are defined by a shared heritage, which usually includes a common language, a common faith, and a common ethnic ancestry". Those of other ethnicities may be classified as second-class citizens.

The Ottoman Empire and United States are examples of polyethnic states in which the nation is defined by its geographical territory. The theorist Anthony D. Smith uses the term "ethnic nationalism" in that sense.  Diaspora-studies scholars broaden the concept of "nation" to diasporic communities. The terms ethnonation and ethnonationalism are sometimes used to describe a conceptual collective of dispersed ethnics.
Defining an  ethnos widely can lead to ethnic nationalism becoming a form of pan-nationalism or macronationalism - as in cases such as pan-Germanism or pan-Slavism.

Conceptual development
The study of ethnonationalism emerged in the early 20th century in the interwar period between World War I and World War II, with the "redrawing of the political map of Europe in part along ethnic and national lines according to a proclaimed “right of peoples” to self-determination and the rise of fascist ethnocentric ideologies (including Nazism).

During the Cold War, the independence movement initiated in former European colonies in Asia and Africa reinvigorated research into ethnic, tribal and national identities and the "political difficulties" stemming from their interactions with territorial statehood, while the collapse of the Soviet Union in the 1980s and 1990s and the "resurgence of ethnic and national claims and conflicts in its aftermath" only further spurred ethnonationalism scholarship in the late 20th century.

Increased international migration as a function of contemporary globalization has also given rise to "ethno-national" movements, including reactionary "nativist" groups focused on exclusionary identity politics. In the developed world, such trends have often taken on an explicitly xenophobic and racist character, as seen in the example of "white nationalism" in the United States.

Characteristics
The central political tenet of ethnic nationalism is that ethnic groups are entitled to self-determination. The outcome of this right to self-determination may vary, from calls for self-regulated administrative bodies within an already established society, to an autonomous entity separate from that society, to the institution of ethnic federalism within a multi-ethnic society, to establishing an independent sovereign state removed from that society. In international relations, it also leads to policies and movements for irredentism to claim a common nation based upon ethnicity, or for the establishment of an ethnocratic (mono-ethnocratic or poly-ethnocratic) political structure in which the state apparatus is controlled by a politically and militarily dominant ethnic nationalist group or a group of several ethnic nationalist groups from select ethnicities to further its interests, power and resources.

In scholarly literature, ethnic nationalism is usually contrasted with civic nationalism. Ethnic nationalism bases membership of the nation on descent or heredity, often articulated in terms of common blood or kinship, rather than on political membership. Hence, nation states with strong traditions of ethnic nationalism tend to define nationality or citizenship by jus sanguinis (the law of blood, descent from a person of that nationality), and countries with strong traditions of civic nationalism tend to define nationality or citizenship by jus soli (the law of soil, birth within the nation state). Ethnic nationalism is, therefore, seen as exclusive, while civic nationalism tends to be inclusive. Rather than allegiance to common civic ideals and cultural traditions, then, ethnic nationalism tends to emphasise narratives of common descent.

Some types of ethnic nationalism are firmly rooted in the idea of ethnicity as an inherited characteristic, for example black nationalism or white nationalism, often ethnic nationalism also manifests in the assimilation of minority ethnic groups into the dominant group, for example as with Italianisation. This assimilation may or may not be predicated on a belief in some common ancestry with assimilated groups (for example with Germanisation in the Second World war). An extreme version is racial nationalism.

Recent theories and empirical data suggest that people maintain dual lay beliefs about nationality, such that it can be both inherited biologically at birth and acquired culturally in life.

Role in discrimination
In 2018, Tendayi Achiume, a UN Special Rapporteur on racism, released a UN Human Rights Council report which states that "more than 75% of the world’s known stateless populations belong to minority groups" and highlights the role of ethnonationalism in the international deprivation of citizenship rights. In the report, Achiume re-stated that international human rights law prohibits citizens from discriminating against non-citizens on the basis of their race, descent, national or ethnic origin and she also stated that citizenship, nationality, and immigration laws which discriminate against non-citizens are violations of international law. She also noted the role of laws restricting marriage rights with respect to certain national, religious, ethnic or racial groups, which she said were "often deployed by states to preserve notions of national, ethnic and racial "purity"." Achiume called ethnonationalist politics the "most obvious driver of racial discrimination in citizenship and immigration laws" and driven by populist leaders defining nations "in terms of assumed blood ties and ethnicity".

In the 19th and 20th centuries, European colonial powers used ethnonationalism to justify barring colonial subjects from citizenship, and in Europe, Jews and Roma were excluded from citizenship on the same grounds. Today, migrants are a frequent target of ethnonationalist rhetoric related to "ethnic purity and religious, cultural or linguistic preservation". Even countries with proud histories of immigration have fallen prey to the vilification of "certain racial, religious and national groups" on prejudicial grounds. Achiume called the case of the Rohingya Muslims a "chilling example", with the Burma Citizenship Act of 1982 discriminating based on ethnicity and rendering many Rohingya stateless. The violation of the rights of Afro-Caribbean British citizens from the "Windrush generation" is a pertinent example of similar prejudice in the developed world but states all over the world use misinformation to portray "certain racial, national and religious groups as inherent threats to national security" and justify stripping or denying rights.

Extreme forms of ethnic nationalism, as in the case of Myanmar and its government's persecution of the Rohingya, have been identified as causes of various genocides and episodes of ethnic cleansing. In his 2005 book The Great Game of Genocide, historian Donald Bloxham argued that the Armenian genocide "represents a clear logic of ethnic nationalism when it is carried to its absolute extreme in multinational societies".

Contemporary examples

Ethnic nationalism is present in many states' immigration policies in the form of repatriation laws. Armenia, Bulgaria, Croatia, Finland, Germany, Hungary, Ireland, Israel, Serbia and Turkey provide automatic or rapid citizenship to members of diasporas of their predominant ethnic group, if desired.

Malaysia
In Malaysia, the Bumiputera principle recognises the "special position" of the Malays provided in the Constitution of Malaysia, in particular Article 153. However, the constitution does not use the term bumiputra; it defines only "Malay" and "indigenous peoples" (Article 160(2)), "natives" of Sarawak (161A(6)(a)), and "natives" of Sabah (Article 161A(6) (b)). Some pro-Bumiputra policies exist as affirmative action for bumiputras since the Malaysian New Economic Policy is based on race, not deprivation. For instance, all Bumiputra, regardless of their financial standing, are entitled to a 7 percent discount on houses or property, including luxurious units, but low-income non-Bumiputra receives no such financial assistance. Other preferential policies include quotas for admission to government educational institutions, qualifications for public scholarships, marking of universities exam papers, special classes prior to university's end of term exams, positions in government and ownership of businesses. Most of the policies were established in the 1970s. Many policies focus on trying to achieve a Bumiputra share of corporate equity of at least 30% of the total. Ismail Abdul Rahman proposed that target after the government was unable to agree on a suitable policy goal.

United States
Since the 2016 US presidential election, ethnonationalism has been pushed to the fore of the American political consciousness by the identity politics of Donald Trump surrounding what it means to be a "true" American, which has resulted in ethnocentric ideals becoming "a robust predictor of vote choice for Trump" among white Americans.

Data from the 2016 American National Election Studies (ANES) has revealed a positive association between ethnonationalism and anti-immigrant attitudes among white Americans, whose opposition to immigration is "often grounded in fears of the threat that immigration poses to the robustness of America's national identity" that is shaped by the belief set concerning the traits of "true" Americans.

See also

 Asabiyyah
 Black nationalism
 Black supremacy
 Composite nationalism
 Conservative Revolution (Germany)
 Diaspora politics
 Essentialism
 Ethnic democracy
 Herrenvolk democracy
 Hindutva
 Identitarian movement
 Identity politics
 Ketuanan Melayu
 Korean ethnic nationalism
 List of irredentist claims or disputes
 List of nationalist organizations
 Nationalist historiography
 Nationalization of history
 Nativism (politics)
 Nihonjinron
 Racial nationalism
 Religious nationalism
 Social degeneration
 Stateless nation
 White nationalism
 White supremacy
 Xenophobia
 Zionism

References

Sources

Further reading

External links
The Rise of Ethnonationalism and the Future of Liberal Democracy. Council on Foreign Relations. May 24, 2017

 
Ethnic conflict
Ethnicity in politics
Ethnocentrism
Political theories
Politics and race